Elections to Daventry District Council were held on 4 May 2000. One third of the council was up for election and the Conservative Party stayed in overall control of the council.

After the election, the composition of the council was:
Conservative 20
Labour 13
Liberal Democrat 3
Independent 2

Election result

References
2000 Daventry election result

2000 English local elections
2000
2000s in Northamptonshire